The Raja Muda LRT station is a light rapid transit (LRT) provisional station that will serve the suburb of Section 2 and Section 16 of Shah Alam in Selangor, Malaysia. It serves as one of the stations on the Shah Alam line. The station is located at Section 2 near SIRIM.

References

External links
 LRT3 Bandar Utama-Klang Line

Rapid transit stations in Selangor
Shah Alam Line